Asota isthmia is a moth of the family Erebidae first described by Francis Walker in 1856. It is found in China, Indonesia, Papua New Guinea and the Philippines.

It has a wingspan is 59-63 millimeters.

References

Asota (moth)
Moths of Asia
Moths described in 1856